Brown Mountain or Brown's Mountain may refer to:

Australia
 Brown Mountain forest, East Gippsland, Victoria
 Brown Mountain (New South Wales), mountain in the Monaro region, New South Wales
 Brown Mountain Power Station
 Browns Mountain, small seamount near Sydney, New South Wales

USA
 Brown Mountain (Colorado), high mountain summit
 Brown Mountain (Iron County, Missouri), a summit in Missouri
 Brown Mountain (St. Francois County, Missouri), a summit in Missouri
 Brown Mountain (Schoharie County, New York), a summit in New York
 Brown Mountain, North Carolina, community
 Brown Mountain (North Carolina), low-lying ridge
 Brown Mountain Lights
 Brown Mountain (Klamath County, Oregon)
 Brown Mountain (Tennessee), small mountain
 Brown's Mountain, South Carolina
 Browns Park, isolated mountain valley along the Green River in Colorado and Utah

Other
 "Brown Mountain", a song by the Sword from the album Used Future

See also 
 Mount Brown (disambiguation)
 Brown Peak (disambiguation)